The discography of American pop rock duo Sonny & Cher consists of five studio albums, eight compilation albums, one soundtrack album, two live albums and twenty-one singles. Sonny and Cher had released three albums and one single which achieved Gold status in the United States: Look At Us, Sonny & Cher Live, All I Ever Need Is You and I Got You babe. In the decade they spent together, Sonny and Cher sold over 40 million records worldwide.

Their debut single was released under the pseudonym Caesar and Cleo, and was "The Letter", on the Vault Records label. Later in 1964 they released "Love Is Strange", a cover of Mickey & Sylvia's 1957 classic, and "Do You Wanna Dance" on the Reprise Records label, Those singles received little attention in the US and failed to chart in the Billboard 100. In 1964, "Baby Don't Go" was released as a single and was their first success, becoming a regional hit on the West Coast. After the success of "Baby Don't Go" the couple signed a contract with Atco Records in the US and Atlantic Records in the UK and Europe. On this label, they released three studio albums and two greatest hits compilations between 1965 and 1967. After "I Got You Babe" reached #1 on the Billboard Chart, "Baby Don't Go" was re-released by Reprise Records and reached #8. The single was included on the album Baby Don't Go - Sonny & Cher and Friends, a compilation released by Reprise with their old recordings under the label.

The couple achieved their international success between the years 1965 and 1972, especially when they were signed to Atco/Atlantic Records and MCA/Kapp Records, with hit singles like "I Got You Babe", "Little Man", "The Beat Goes On", "All I Ever Need Is You", "A Cowboy's Work Is Never Done" and "When You Say Love". Their albums Look at Us, The Wondrous World of Sonny & Chér, In Case You're In Love, All I Ever Need Is You, and Mama Was a Rock and Roll Singer, Papa Used to Write All Her Songs were released in North America, United Kingdom, Continental Europe, South Africa and Japan.

Albums

Studio albums

Compilation albums

Soundtrack albums

Live albums

Singles

Video releases

B-sides and other releases
1966: "Hello" appears on the B-side to "But You're Mine", it was recorded during The Wondrous World of Sonny & Chér (1966) album sessions.
1966: "Have I Stayed Too Long" song released on single and appears on the B-side to "Leave Me Be".
1966: "Je M'en Balance (Car Je T'aime)" French version of "But You're Mine" and released in France on a four-track EP and in Canada on a single.
1966: "Mais Tu Es à Moi" second French version of "But You're Mine", only released as a single in Canada.
1967: "A Beautiful Story" only released as a single. "Podunk" is on its B-side.
1967: "Good Combination" only released as a single.
1967: "You And Me" appeared on the B-side of "Good Combination".
1967: "Plastic Man" only released as a single. "Groovy Kind Of Love" is on its B-side.
1967: "Petit Homme" French version of "Little Man". It is released as an EP in France. It's also released as a single in Canada with "Mais Tu Es à Moi" on its B-side.
1967: "Piccolo Ragazzo" Italian version of "Little Man". It's only released as a single in Italy.
1967: "Caro Cara" Italian version of "It's The Little Things". It is released as a single in Italy. It was recorded during the Good Times (1967) album sessions.
1967: "Fantasie" Italian version of "Don't Talk To Strangers". It is released on the B-side of "Caro Cara".
1967: "Il Cammino Di Ogni Speranza" released as a single in Italy.
1967: "L'umanita" released on the B-side of "Il Cammino Di Ogni Speranza".
1969: "Circus" only released as a single. The movie version of "I Got You Babe" is on its B-side.
1969: "You Gotta Have A Thing Of Your Own" only released as a single. The movie version of "I Got You Babe" is on its B-side.
1969: "You're A Friend Of Mine" only released as a single. The solo song "I Would Marry You Today" by Bono is on its B-side.
1970: "Get It Together" only released as a single.
1970: "Hold You Tighter" this song is on the B-side of Get It Together.
1971: "Real People" this song is released on the B-side of the Somebody single.
1971: "When You Say Love" this is only released on a single.
1977: "You're Not Right For Me" this was the comeback-single of Sonny & Cher but it didn't chart.
1977: "Wrong Number" this song is on the B-side of You're Not Right For Me.

Notes:
A   I Got You Babe was certified Gold in the US for the sales of over 1,000,000 copies. It also charted on the "Billboard Black Singles Chart" and reached #19. In 1966 it re-entered the French singles chart for one week at #76, and the UK singles chart in 1993 at #66, almost 30 years after its release.
B  The Revolution Kind, Laugh At Me and My Best Friend's Girl Is Out Of Sight were solo singles by Sonny Bono.
C  Released only as a single, and available on the CD reissue.
D  Also available on the 1998 CD reissue of In Case You're in Love.

See also
Sonny & Cher, the main article
Sonny Bono, the main article
Cher, the main article
Cher albums discography
List of best selling music artists
List of number-one hits (United States)
List of artists who reached number one on the Hot 100 (U.S.)

References

Discographies of American artists
Pop music group discographies
Sonny & Cher